Helaeomyia is a genus of shore flies (insects in the family Ephydridae).

Species
Helaeomyia bacoa (Mathis & Zatwarnicki, 1998)
Helaeomyia colombiana (Lizarralde de Grosso, 1982)
Helaeomyia cressoni (Lizarralde de Grosso, 1982)
Helaeomyia cubensis (Mathis & Zatwarnicki, 1998)
Helaeomyia dominicana (Mathis & Zatwarnicki, 1998)
Helaeomyia mathisi (Lizarralde de Grosso, 1982)
Helaeomyia metatarsata (Cresson, 1939)
Helaeomyia oligocarda (Lizarralde de Grosso, 1982)
Helaeomyia petrolei (Coquillett, 1899)
Helaeomyia schildi (Cresson, 1944)

References

Ephydridae
Brachycera genera
Taxa named by Ezra Townsend Cresson
Diptera of North America
Diptera of South America